Oliver Lieb (born 1969 in Frankfurt, West Germany) is a German electronic music producer and DJ. Lieb is known to have more than a dozen aliases with over 200 productions and remixes in various electronic genres such as trance, house, and techno. He has also produced tracks for other artists.

Career
Lieb began his musical career at the age of fourteen, as a bassist, playing in funk and soul bands. However, he often left the bands he played in before they found any real success. Eventually he started exploring electronic music.

His first record, under the alias 'Force Legato', was released by ZYX Music. In 1992, Lieb met Matthias Schindehutte, A&R man for the newly formed Harthouse record label, who contracted him for the Spicelab project. At the same time, Lieb started work on harder tracks, released using the alias Psilocybin. 1993 saw his first releases under the alias L.S.G. on the Hamburg-based Superstition record label, which he discontinued in 2007; in 2015, Lieb announced the reactivation of the project. In 1994, he first co-operated with Harald Großkopf (whom he later also performed with live), releasing tracks using the alias The Ambush. Numerous other aliases were developed by Lieb during the 1990s; these included 23 different aliases as a solo artist, including Paragliders and Superspy, and twenty-two aliases for different groups and collaborations, including Force Legato (with Torsten Fenslau) and Azid Force (with Pascal Dardoufas, a.k.a. Pascal F.E.O.S.).

In 1997, using the alias LSG, Lieb spent one week at #63 in the UK Singles Chart with "Netherworld". In 2000, and using his own name, he appeared in the UK Singles Chart for one week at #72 with the track "Metropolis", billed as 'Oliver Lieb presents Smoked'.

References

External links
 http://www.oliverlieb.com/
 Oliver Lieb discography
 Oliver Lieb/Maschine on Myspace

1969 births
Living people
German male musicians
Jeskola Buzz users